Lazurne (until 1975: Novooleksiyivka) is an urban-type settlement in Skadovsk Raion, Kherson Oblast, southern Ukraine, situated on the coast of the Black Sea. It is 28 kilometres west of Skadovsk and 100 km from Kherson. The closest railway station, Brylivka, is located 80 km away. Lazurne hosts the administration of the Lazurne settlement hromada, one of the hromadas of Ukraine. It had a population of

Culture 
The settlement is a large climatic seaside recreation center of the region. There are about 30 lodges and summer camps in Lazurne.

See also
 Dzharylhach

References

External links 
 Settlement council of Lazurne 

1803 establishments in Ukraine
Populated places established in 1803
Urban-type settlements in Skadovsk Raion